Job Bicknell Ellis (January 21, 1829 – December 30, 1905) was a pioneering North American mycologist known for his study of ascomycetes, especially the grouping of fungi called the Pyrenomycetes (known today as the Sordariomycetes). Born and raised in New York, he worked as a teacher and farmer before developing an interest in mycology. He collected specimens extensively, and together with his wife, prepared 200,000 sets of dried fungal samples that were sent out to subscribers in series between 1878 and 1894. Together with colleagues William A. Kellerman and Benjamin Matlack Everhart, he founded the Journal of Mycology in 1885, forerunner to the modern journal Mycologia. He described over 4000 species of fungi, and his collection of over 100,000 specimens is currently housed at the herbarium of the New York Botanical Gardens. Ellis had over 100 taxa of fungi named in his honor.

Life

Ellis was born in Potsdam, New York, on January 21, 1829, to parents Freeman Ellis and Sarah Bicknell. He was the tenth child of fourteen. In 1851, he graduated from Union College in Schenectady, New York, the same institution attended by lichenologist Edward Tuckerman (A.B. 1837) and mycologist Charles Horton Peck (A.B. 1859). Bicknell began an erratic career as a classics teacher and farmer in New York, Pennsylvania, and South Carolina. He became the principal of the Canton Academy in 1856, the same year he married Arvilla Jane Bacon, who became his lifelong assistant and collaborator. Their daughter Cora was born on January 12, 1857; she later became a professional musician in New York. It was around this time that Bicknell started developing his interest in botany, by collecting plants with fellow teachers on weekends. He saw a copy of Henry William Ravenel's Fungi Caroliniani Exsiccati, a set of dried specimens (exsiccati) collected from North Carolina and area. Ellis initiated a correspondence with Ravenel, and established a friendship that lasted until Ravenel's death in 1887.

Ellis taught in a public school in Potsdam village in 1863, and later served on the Union side in the American civil war from 1864 to 1865. He served on the steam frigate USS Susquehanna of the North Atlantic Blockading Squadron, and was present during the bombardment of Fort Fisher on December 24–25, 1864 and January 13–15, 1865, when the Fort was captured. The war took its toll on his spirits; his April 22, 1865, diary entry reads: "I have felt degraded ever since I have been here & no amount of money & I might perhaps safely say no motive not even patriotism will ever induce me to put myself in the like position again." He was discharged from the Navy on May 18, 1865, and returned to Potsdam. After the war Ellis settled in Newfield, New Jersey, where he lived until his death.

Although he did not have any formal training as a botanist or mycologist, Ellis gradually took up mycological fieldwork and ultimately dedicated his life to the collection and exchange of dried fungal specimens. He created reference collections that were sold in sets of one hundred, or "centuries". The most important of these were the Fungi Nova-Caesarienses (Fungi of New Jersey) (1878) and the North American Fungi, issued in series from 1878 to 1894. The complete set of exsiccati numbered 3200 specimens. The obituary of his wife, who died on July 18, 1899, elaborated her devotion to his work: Besides binding many of her husband's books and pamphlets, she prepared some three thousand blank books in which the North American Fungi were issued and in which the greater part of the Ellis collection was mounted. Besides this she arranged at least three fourths of the 200,000 specimens which were issued in this series and in the Fungi Columbiani, folding papers, inserting specimens, pasting labels and inserting in their places.

Based in Newfield, New Jersey, Ellis maintained an extensive correspondence with many renowned American and European mycologists. In 1880, Ellis began to receive financial support from Benjamin Matlock Everhart, a wealthy merchant of West Chester, Pennsylvania. Together they co-authored North American Pyrenomycetes (1892). With William A. Kellerman, Ellis and Everhart founded the Journal of Mycology in 1885, a forerunner to Mycologia. Most of the articles in the first issues were written by Ellis. He published many of his newly discovered species in the journal, as well as the Botanical Gazette, Torrey Bulletin, American Naturalist, and Proceedings of the Philadelphia Academy. In 1896, near the end of his life, Ellis sold his collection of over 100,000 specimens to the New York Botanical Garden for its Cryptogamic Herbarium, including the types of 4,000 new species described by Ellis and his collaborators. The Garden Library also received a "large cache" of his letters in 1983. Ellis was a prolific author, and published over 500 scientific articles. He died December 30, 1905, in Newfield.

Memberships and societies
Ellis was honored by several scientific societies. In 1878, he was elected a corresponding member of Philadelphia's Academy of Natural Sciences. In August 1882 he was elected a corresponding member of the Cryptogamic Society of Scotland and in December of the same year was elected a corresponding member of "Die Kaiserlich-Königliche Zoologisch-Botanische Gesellschaft in Wien".

Eponymous taxa

Ellisiella Bat. 1956
Ellisiella Sacc. 1881 (now Colletotrichum)
Ellisiellina Sousa da Câmara 1949 (now Colletotrichum)
Elisiodothis Theiss 1914
Ellisiopsis Bat. 1956 (now Beltraniella)
Ellisomyces Benny & R.K. Benj. 1975 
Ellisius Gray. 1821
Jobellisia M.E. Barr 1993

Acanthostigma ellisii Sacc. & P. Syd. 1899
Aecidium ellisii Tracy & L.D. Galloway 1888
Albatrellopsis ellisii (Berk.) Teixeira 1994
Albatrellus ellisii (Berk.) Pouzar 1966
Alternaria ellisii Pandotra & Ganguly 1964
Annellophorella ellisii Reisinger & Kiffer 1970
Anthostoma ellisii Sacc.
Ascochyta ellisii Thüm.
Asterina ellisii Sacc. & P. Syd. 1899
Atractobolus ellisiella (Rehm) Kuntze 1898
Bactridium ellisii Berk. 1874
Bipolaris ellisii (Danquah) Alcorn 1983
Botrytis ellisii Sacc. & P. Syd. 1899
Bullaria ellisii (De Toni) Arthur & Mains
Calathella ellisii Agerer 1983
Caliciopsis ellisii Sacc.
Calycina ellisii (Dennis) Raitv. 2004
Capnodium ellisii Sacc.
Cenangium ellisii Sacc.
Cercospora ellisii Sacc. & P. Syd. 1899
Ceuthospora ellisii Sacc. & Trotter 1913
Chaetendophragmia ellisii (Piroz.) B. Sutton & Hodges 1978
Chaetomium ellisianum Sacc. & P. Syd.
Chaetoplea ellisii (Sacc. & P. Syd.) M.E. Barr 1990
Chaetosphaeria ellisii (M.E. Barr) Huhndorf & F.A. Fernández 2005
Chalara ellisii Nag Raj & W.B. Kendr. 1975
Clasterosporium ellisii Sacc. & P. Syd. 1899
Clathrosphaerina ellisii Purohit, Panwar & N.L.Vyas 1974
Cochliobolus ellisii Alcorn 1983
Collybia ellisii (Murrill) Murrill 1917
Comatricha ellisii Morgan 1894
Coniochaeta ellisiorum P.F. Cannon
Coniophora ellisii (Berk. & M.A. Curtis) Sacc. 1888
Coprinellus ellisii (P.D. Orton) Redhead, Vilgalys & Moncalvo 2001
Coprinus ellisii P.D. Orton 1960
Corticium ellisii (Berk. & M.A. Curtis) Cooke 1880
Coryne ellisii Berk. 1873
Cucurbitaria ellisii Sacc. & P. Syd.
Curvularia ellisii S.I. Ahmed & M. Qureshi 1960
Cylindrosporium ellisii Halst.
Cylindrotrichum ellisii Morgan-Jones 1977
Dacrymyces ellisii Coker 1920
Dacryopsis ellisiana Massee 1891
Dasyscyphus ellisianus (Rehm) Sacc. 1889
Dendryphion ellisii Cooke 1878
Diaporthe ellisii Rehm
Dicaeoma ellisianum (Thüm.) Kuntze 1898
Dicaeoma ellisii (De Toni) Kuntze 1898
Didymostilbe ellisii A.S. Saxena & Mukerji 1970
Dimerosporium ellisii Sacc.
Diplodina ellisii Sacc.
Dothiora ellisii (M.E. Barr) Shoemaker & C.E. Babc. 1987
Dothiorella ellisii Arx 1957
Drechslera ellisii Danquah 1975
Endophragmiella ellisii S. Hughes 1979
Engizostoma ellisii Kuntze 1898
Entoleuca ellisii Y.M. Ju, J.D. Rogers & H.M. Hsieh 2005
Entyloma ellisii Halst. 1890
Entylomella ellisii (Halst.) Cif. 1959
Erynia ellisiana Ben Ze'ev 1986
Erysiphe ellisii (U. Braun) U. Braun & S. Takam. 2000
Fomes ellisianus F.W. Anderson 1891
Furia ellisiana (Ben Ze'ev) Humber 1989
Fusicoccum ellisianum Sacc. & P. Syd. 1899
Fusicoccum ellisii Petr. & Died. 1913
Glabrocyphella ellisiana W.B. Cooke 1961
Gloniopsis ellisii Cash 1939
Gymnopus ellisii Murrill 1917
Gymnosporangium ellisii Berk. 1879
Hamaspora ellisii (Berk.) Körn. 1877
Haplaria ellisii Cooke 1889
Helicosporium ellisii Cooke
Hemiarcyria ellisii Massee 1889
Herpotrichia ellisii (Sacc. & P. Syd.) M.E. Barr 1992
Hydnum ellisianum Thüm. 1878
Hydnum ellisianum (Banker) Sacc. & Trotter 1912
Hymenochaete ellisii Berk. & M.A. Curtis 1876
Hymenoscyphus ellisii Dennis 1964
Hyphopolynema ellisiorum B. Sutton & Alcorn 1984
Kylindria ellisii (Morgan-Jones) DiCosmo, S.M. Berch & W.B. Kendr. 1983
Lachnella ellisiana (Rehm) Seaver 1951
Lasiosphaeria ellisii M.E. Barr 1993
Leptosphaeria ellisiana Berl.
Lyophyllum ellisii (P.D. Orton) Cons. & Contu 2001
Macroplodia ellisii (Sacc.) Kuntze 1898
Melanopsamma ellisii Sacc. & P. Syd. 1899
Meliola ellisii Roum. 1880
Microscypha ellisii Dennis 1971
Microsphaera ellisii U. Braun 1982
Monochaetia ellisiana Sacc. & D. Sacc. 1906Myxosporium ellisii Sacc. 1884Nectria ellisii C. Booth 1959Niptera ellisii RehmNodulisporium ellisii (Sacc. & P. Syd.) S. Hughes 1958Odontia ellisiana (Thüm.) Rick 1933Ophiobolus ellisianus Berl.Peniophora ellisii Massee 1889Perenniporia ellisiana (F.W. Anderson) Gilb. & Ryvarden 1985Periconia ellisii P.Rag. Rao & D. Rao 1964Periconiella ellisii Merny & B. Huguenin 1962Pestalotia ellisii Sacc. & P. Syd. 1899Peziza ellisiana RehmPhellodon ellisianus Banker 1906Phillipsiella ellisii M.E. Barr 1993Phragmidium ellisii (Berk.) Sacc. 1888Phyllosticta ellisiana Lambotte & Fautrey 1894Phyllosticta ellisii Sacc. & P. Syd. 1899Pithomyces ellisii V.G. Rao & Chary 1972Pleospora ellisii Wehm. 1961Pleurage ellisiana Griffiths 1901Plochmopeltis ellisii Arx 1959Podisoma ellisii (Berk.) Mussat 1874Podospora ellisiana (Griffiths) Mirza & Cain 1970Polynema ellisii B. SuttonPolypilus ellisii (Berk.) Teixeira 1992Polyporus ellisianus (Murrill) Sacc. & Trotter 1912Polyporus ellisii Berk. 1878Polystictus ellisianus Lloyd 1920Poria ellisiana (F.W. Anderson) Ginns 1984Pseudocercospora pamelae-ellisiae (G.P. Agarwal & N.D. Sharma) U. Braun 1999Psilachnum ellisii (Dennis) E. Weber & Baral 1992Puccinia ellisiana Thüm. 1878
Puccinia ellisii De Toni 1888
Pyrenopeziza ellisii Massee 1896
Rhabdospora ellisii Sacc. & P. Syd. 1899
Rhinocladiella ellisii D. Hawksw. 1977 (now Zasmidium cellare)
Roestelia ellisii Peck 1875
Scindalma ellisianum (F.W. Anderson) Kuntze 1898
Sciniatosporium ellisii (M.B. Ellis) Morgan-Jones 1971
Scutiger ellisii (Berk.) Murrill 1903
Septoria ellisiana Sacc. & P. Syd. 1902Septoria ellisii Berl. & Voglino 1886Sordaria ellisiana (Griffiths) Sacc. & D. Sacc. 1905Sorosporium ellisii G. WinterSphaeropsis ellisii Sacc. 1884Sporidesmium ellisii Piroz. 1972Sporisorium ellisii (G. Winter) M. Piepenbr. 2003Stigmina ellisiana B. Sutton 1972Stigmina ellisii M.B. Ellis 1959Stigmina pamelae-ellisiae G.P. Agarwal & N.D. Sharma 1974Tephrocybe ellisii P.D. Orton 1988Tetrabrunneospora ellisii Dyko 1978Tetraploa ellisii Cooke 1879Tomentella ellisii (Sacc.) Jülich & Stalpers 1980Torula ellisii Yadav & Lal 1966Trametes ellisiana Henn. 1895Tyromyces ellisianus Murrill 1907Uromyces ellisianus Henn. 1898Volutella ellisii Langl. 1887Wettsteinina ellisii M.E. Barr 1972Zoophthora ellisiana (Ben Ze'ev) Balazy 1993Zygodesmus ellisii'' Sacc. 1886

References

External links

American mycologists
1829 births
1905 deaths
People from Gloucester County, New Jersey
Union College (New York) alumni
Scientists from New York (state)